Jalaal Hartley is a British television actor, writer and director.

Filmography

External links
 

Living people
British male television actors
Year of birth missing (living people)
21st-century British male actors
British people of Iranian descent